Liar Game is a Japanese  television drama series in 2007.  It was adapted from a popular manga of the same name into a live action series directed by Hiroaki Matsuyama.  The drama  began airing in Japan on April 14, 2007. It featured Erika Toda as Nao Kanzaki, and Shota Matsuda as Shinichi Akiyama. The first season of Liar Game had 11 episodes, with a 3 hour long finale, which was a first for a drama series. It has also gained the second highest viewer satisfaction rating, for the season, in an Oricon survey.

Cast

Players

Liar Game Tournament

Episodes

External links
Official TV Drama Website from Fuji

References

Japanese drama television series
2007 Japanese television series debuts
2007 Japanese television series endings
Fuji TV dramas
Japanese television dramas based on manga
Television shows about gambling
Liar Game
Fraud in television